Yanacushman (possibly from Quechua yana black, kusma (or kushma in the local variant) nightdress, shirt of a woman, "black nightdress" or "black shirt", -n a suffix) is a mountain in the Huayhuash mountain range in the Andes of Peru, about  high. It is located in the Lima Region, Cajatambo Province, Cajatambo District. Yanacushman lies on the southern sub-range west of the main range, northwest of Julcán and Huacshash. It is situated between the Huayllapa valley and the Pumarinri valley.

References

Mountains of Peru
Mountains of Lima Region